Theresa Scholze (born February 11, 1980 in Schmölln) is a German actress.

Life 
Scholze comes from a family of actors. Her grandparents Hildegard Schirrmeister and Heinz Scholze were actors. Her mother Sabine Scholze is a stage actress at the Hans Otto Theater in Potsdam, and her father Jürgen Mai, her sister Caroline Scholze, and her husband Paul Thorsten Grasshoff are also in the profession.

Born in Schmölln, Bezirk Leipzig, Scholze grew up in Brandenburg. She gained her first theater experience in the youth theater group of the Brandenburg Theater. After graduating from the Bertolt-Brecht-Gymnasium in Brandenburg an der Havel, Scholze completed an apprenticeship at the University of Music and Theatre Leipzig.

Scholze became known as an actress through her role of the daughter of coroner Robert Kolmaar in the television series Der letzte Zeuge (The Last Witness), for which she was awarded the Telestar as a young actress in 1998. She has been working in film, television, and theater. In the 2002-2003 season, she played a leading role in Quizoola! at the Schauspiel Leipzig, in 2003 in the satire play Ein Probeschuss für den Freischütz, and from 2003 to 2004 as Cordelia in King Lear at the Hans-Otto-Theater Potsdam.

From March 2, 2009 to February 24, 2010, she played the leading female role in the ZDF telenovela Alisa - Folge deinem Herzen (Alisa - Follow Your Heart). Jan Hartmann was the lead at her side. She shot for the telenovela from November 2008 to November 2009. 

Since 2018, Scholze has played a leading role as lawyer Lisa Huber in the series Daheim in den Bergen (At Home In the Mountains).

Scholze is married. She lived in Cologne for six years before moving back to her old home in Potsdam.

Filmography

Audio plays 

 Dick Francis: Zügellos (Wild Horses). Radio play adaptation after the novel Zügellos. Adapted by Alexander Schnitzler. Directed by Klaus Zippel, Produced by MDR and SWR, 2002. Music by Pierre Oser. 1 CD, length approx. 71 min. Der Audio Verlag, Berlin 2003, ISBN 3-89813-26-6-8.

Awards 

 1998: Telestar "Promotional Award for Best Newcomer Actress" for the role of Anna Kolmaar in Der letzte Zeuge

References

External links 
 
 Theresa Scholze at OFDb
 Theresa Scholze's website
 Theresa Scholze's agency profile

1980 births
Living people
20th-century German actresses
21st-century German actresses